Ruben Tagalog (October 18, 1922 – March 5, 1985) was a Filipino actor and musician, famous for his works in the Kundiman style. He was also one of the founders of the singing group Mabuhay Singers. He is known as the Father of Kundiman. He performed for the Japanese during the their occupation of the Philippines.

Later career
He first caught the attention of radio listeners in the 1940s when he hosted his own radio program, Harana ni Ruben Tagalog. His baritone voice filled his songs Ramona, "O Ilaw", Sayang, Azucena, and Nasaan Ka Ngayon with emotion. He revived danzas and balitaws like Nahan Kaya Ikaw, Bakit Ka Lumuluha, Barong Tagalog, Dalagang Pilipina, and Caprichosa. He was the first artist to record Bayan Ko and Ang Pasko ay Sumapit. Tagalog is also known for Harana or serenade songs such as Dungawin Mo, Hirang  and Kay Lungkot Nitong Hatinggabi.

In spite of his last name being "Tagalog", he was born in the city of Iloilo in the Visayas and thus was a speaker of Hiligaynon or Ilonggo. He released at least two albums in the Cebuano language: "Ruben Tagalog Sings Visayan Songs" and a duet album with Cebuana singer Nora Hermosa called "Duet in Visayan".

In the early 1950s, he became the first to popularise the Tagalog version of the 1933 Visayan Christmas carol "Kasadya Ning Taknaa" as "Ang Pasko Ay Sumapit". The Tagalog lyrics were written by Levi Celerio. He is also famous for performing Panahon 'tang Nagdaan, a kundiman composed by Ambrosio del Rosario.

Death
He died on March 5, 1985, in Orange County, California. He is laid to rest at Forest Lawn Memorial in California.

Legacy
Today, after Ruben's death, his legacy is also known as the Philippines Father Of Kundiman or Hari ng Kundiman (King of Kundiman) and the King of Ballads.

Awards

Popularity
His posthumous songs were featured on Yesterday and Remember When on DZMM every Sunday, and also featured on Moonlight Serenade every weekdays the following mornings on DZMM.

DWIZ882 radio show 'Bella Filipina' (heard every Sunday evening) honored Ruben Tagalog's centennial for the entire month of October 2022, and continues to air his recordings of balitaws, danzas and novelties.

References

External links
 

1922 births
1985 deaths
Filipino musicians
Male actors from Iloilo
20th-century Filipino male actors
Visayan people